Emilia Soini (born 16 October 1995 in Espoo) is a Finnish professional squash player. In August 2021, she was ranked number 47 in the world.

References

1995 births
Living people
Sportspeople from Espoo
Finnish female squash players
20th-century Finnish women
21st-century Finnish women
Competitors at the 2022 World Games